Sandra SPA Pogoń Szczecin is a men's handball club from Szczecin, Poland, that plays in the Superliga.

European record

EHF Cup

Team

Current squad
Squad for the 2022–23 season

Goalkeepers
 22  Grzegorz Jagodziński
 27  Luka Arsenić
 28  Maksym Viunik
Left wingers
 23  Dawid Krysiak
 24  Grzegorz Nowak
Right wingers
5  Patryk Krok
 26  Krzysztof Mitruczuk
Line players 
7  Eliasz Kapela

Left backs
6  Filip Wrzesiński
 11  Paweł Krupa
 14  Hubert Wiśniewski
Centre backs
9  Vladyslav Zalevskyi
 15  Matija Starčević
Right backs
 17  Bogdan Cherkashchenko
 99  Jakub Polok

Transfers
Transfers for the 2022–23 season

 Joining
  Krzysztof Mitruczuk (RW) (from  SMS Płock)

 Leaving
  Tomasz Wiśniewski (GK) (to  Stal Mielec)
  Łukasz Gierak (CB) (to  ARGED KPR Ostrovia)
  Mateusz Zaremba (RB) (retires)
  Wojciech Jedziniak (RW) (retires)
  Arkadiusz Bosy (P) (retires)
  Adam Wąsowski (P) (to  Górnik Zabrze)

References

External links
Official website 

Pogoń Szczecin
Polish handball clubs
Sport in Szczecin
Handball clubs established in 2007
2007 establishments in Poland